Brian Evans may refer to:

Sportsmen
Brian Evans (basketball) (born 1973), American former basketball player
Brian Evans (Glamorgan cricketer) (1936–2011), Glamorgan and Lincolnshire cricketer
Brian Evans (Hertfordshire cricketer) (born 1964), Hertfordshire cricketer
Brian Evans (footballer) (1940–2003), Welsh footballer
Brian Evans (rugby union), New Zealand rugby union coach

Others
Brian Evans (politician) (born 1950), Canadian lawyer and former provincial level politician from Alberta, Canada
Brian S. Evans, American politician from Arkansas
Brian Evans (RAF officer) (1921–1944), Royal Air Force bomber pilot